Sons, (stylized, SONS), formerly Sons of God, was an American Christian music band from Oklahoma City, Oklahoma. They started making music in 2007 and disbanded in 2008, only to reform in 2009, and disbanded again in 2013. Their members were Aaron Newberry, Ethan Kattau, David Gedders and Chris Erickson when they finally disbanded, with former members being Jordan McGee, Alex Rust, Kyle Laster, and Michael Lopez.

Music history
The band started in 2007, with their first release, The Genesis Prologue, an extended play, while they were called Sons of God,  released by Come&Live! Records, on January 12, 2010. Their first studio album, Keep Quiet, was released on February 14, 2012, with Slospeak Records. This album had two singles released, where they charted on the Billboard magazine Christian Rock chart, while "Doubt" peaked at No. 7, the single, "Masters of Flattery", peaked at No. 21. Their last release, an extended play, Keep Quieter, released on December 11, 2012, by Slospeak Records.

Members
Last known line-up
 Aaron Newberry – lead vocals, guitar
 Ethan Kattau – lead guitar
 David Geders – bass
 Chris Erickson – drums
Former members
 Michael Lopez – drums
 Jordan McGee - drums 
 Kyle Laster - guitar
 Alex Rust - guitar

Discography
Studio albums
 Keep Quiet (February 14, 2012, Slospeak)
EPs
 The Genesis Prologue (January 8, 2010, Come&Live!, as Sons of God)
 Keep Quieter (December 11, 2012, Slospeak)
Singles

References

External links
 Last.fm biography

Musical groups from Oklahoma
2007 establishments in Oklahoma
Musical groups established in 2007
Musical groups disestablished in 2013